Texas Independence Day is the celebration of the adoption of the Texas Declaration of Independence on March 2, 1836. With this document signed by 59 delegates, settlers in Mexican Texas officially declared independence from Mexico and created the Republic of Texas.

It is not, however, an official state holiday whereby offices are closed, but instead a "partial staffing holiday"; state offices are required to be open on that day but with reduced staffing.

See also
Timeline of the Texas Revolution
San Jacinto Day

References

External links
Washington on the Brazos
Official Texas State Holidays
Texas Declaration of Independence
Handbook of Texas Online
A True and Unexaggerated Summary of Texas Heroics

Texas state holidays
Texas Revolution
State holidays in the United States
March observances